Miresa sibinoides is a moth of the family Limacodidae first described by Hering in 1931. It is found in Sri Lanka and India.

References

Moths of Asia
Moths described in 1931
Limacodidae